HU? is an Estonian band. The name "HU?" is derived from the first letters of Estonian singer Hannaliisa Uusma.

In 2009, the band won two awards in Estonian Music Awards, namely, in the categories "best band of the year" and "best album of the year".

Members
Hannaliisa Uusma
DJ Critikal
Leslie Laasner
Sigrid Mutso.

Discography

Albums
2008 "Film" (Mindnote)
2010 "HU2"(Mindnote)
2011 "Läbi Öö" (Mindnote)
2013 "Bermuda" (Mindnote)

References

Estonian musical groups